Acacia lasiocalyx, commonly known as silver wattle or shaggy wattle, is a tree or shrub belonging to the genus Acacia and the subgenus Juliflorae.

Taxonomy 
The species is closely related to Acacia conniana which has nonpruinose branchlets, shorter phyllodes and smaller pods enclosing smaller seeds. Other relatives are A. anastema and A. longiphyllodinea.

The Noongar peoples know the tree as wilyurwur.

Description
It blooms from July to October producing yellow flowers. They are pruinose with  spikes and with a diameter of  densely packed with a golden colour. The seeds are longitudinal with an elliptic to oblong shape.

Distribution
It is native to a large area in the Wheatbelt, Goldfields-Esperance and Great Southern regions of Western Australia, and is found as far north as Eneabba an south as Bremer Bay and east as Kalgoorlie. It is typically found growing as a thicket amongst granite outcrops.

Ecology 
The tree is fibrous and copes well in arid conditions. These thickets thin out over the following decades, and trees my attain a height of 25 metres.

See also
 List of Acacia species

References

lasiocalyx
Acacias of Western Australia
Plants described in 1904
Taxa named by Cecil Rollo Payton Andrews